The South Tyrone Empowerment Programme (STEP) is a rights-based non-governmental organisation based in Dungannon, Northern Ireland. Founded in 1997, it provides a range of services and advocacy in areas including community development, training, support and advice for migrants, policy work and community enterprise, with its commercial arm, STL, currently concentrating on interpreting and translation. It was founded and is led by Bernadette Devlin McAliskey and has been funded by European Union grants and philanthropy.

External links
STEP website

Community empowerment
Social entrepreneurship
Human rights organisations based in the United Kingdom